This article represents the structure of the Hungarian Defence Forces as of 2020:

Command structure 

Article 45 of the Constitution of Hungary states that the core duties of the Defence Forces are: "military defence of the independence, territorial integrity and borders of Hungary and the performance of collective defence and peacekeeping tasks arising from international treaties, as well as carrying out humanitarian activities in accordance with the rules of international law."

The President holds the title of commander-in-chief of the Defence Force. The Government (chaired by the Prime Minister) decides on the deployment and operations undertaken by the Defence Force, all deployments abroad with the exception of EU or NATO missions, needs permission from the National Assembly. The Minister of Defence jointly with Chief of Staff administers the Defence Force, including the Hungarian Ground Force and the Hungarian Air Force.

Since 2007, the Hungarian Defence Force has been under a unified command structure with all operational units falling under the Hungarian Defence Forces Combat Command. The previous Land Command became a joint-service, army and air, command. The two branches of the Defense Forces – the Hungarian Air Force and Hungarian Ground Forces have now only administrative functions.

Logistic Support for the defence forces is managed by the Hungarian Defense Forces Logistics Center, while the training for all units is the responsibility of the Hungarian Defense Forces Formation, Preparation and Training Command.

Current Organization

Hungarian Defense Forces Combat Command 
 Hungarian Defense Forces Combat Command, in Székesfehérvár
 Hungarian Defense Forces Operations Centre, in Székesfehérvár
 2nd Special Operations Brigade "Vitéz Bertalan Árpád", at Szolnok Air Base
 34th Special Forces Battalion "László Bercsényi", at Szolnok Air Base
 88th Mixed Light Battalion, at Szolnok Air Base
 5th Infantry Brigade "István Bocskai", in Debrecen
 Command Company, in Debrecen
 3rd Infantry Battalion "Miklós Bercsényi", in Hódmezővásárhely, with BTR-80 APCs
 39th Infantry Battalion in Debrecen, with BTR-80 APCs
 62nd Infantry Battalion in Hódmezővásárhely, with BTR-80 APCs
 Operations Support Engineer Battalion, in Debrecen
 Logistic Battalion, in Debrecen
 Combat Engineer Company, in Debrecen
 Signal Company, in Debrecen
 25th Infantry Brigade "György Klapka", in Tata
 Command Company, in Tata
 1st Infantry Battalion, in Tata, with BTR-80 APCs
 2nd Infantry Battalion, in Tata, with BTR-80 APCs
 11th Tank Battalion, in Tata, with 44x Leopard 2A7+ main battle tanks
 36th Anti-tank Missile Battalion, in Tata, with 9K115-2 Metis-M anti-tank missiles
 57th Garrison Support Battalion, in Tata
 101st Artillery Battalion, in Tata, with 24x Panzerhaubitze 2000 155 mm self-propelled howitzers
 Logistic Battalion, in Tata
 1st Explosive Ordnance Disposal and River Flotilla Regiment "Honvéd", at Újpest port in Budapest
 1st Explosive Ordnance Disposal Company
 Special Explosive Ordnance Disposal Company
 River Flotilla
 Explosive Ordnance Disposal K-9 Company
 Logistic Company
 Logistic Battalion
 Training Company
 24th Reconnaissance Regiment "Gergely Bornemissza", in Debrecen
 Command and Signal Company
 Reconnaissance Company
 Long-Range Reconnaissance Company
 Tactical Intelligence Company (HUMINT)
 Unmanned Aerial Vehicle Company
 Electronic Warfare Company
 Logistic Company
 37th Engineer Regiment "Ferenc Rákóczi II", in Szentes
 Command Support Platoon
 Bridge Building Battalion
 Low Water Bridge Building Company
 Water Purification Company
 Construction Engineer Company
 Training Company
 43rd Signal and Command Support Regiment "József Nagysándor", in Székesfehérvár
 Command and Guard Company
 Combat Command Main C4I Centre
 Transdanubian Signal and C4I Centre
 Lowland Signal and C4I Centre, at Szolnok Air Base
 Signal Battalion
 Logistic Battalion
 54th Radar Regiment "Veszprém", in Veszprém
 Command Company
 1st Radar Data Centre, in Békéscsaba, with RAT-31DL
 2nd Radar Data Centre, in Medina, with RAT-31DL
 3rd Radar Data Centre, in Bánkút, with RAT-31DL
 11th Radar Company, in Kup
 12th Radar Company, in Juta
 21st Radar Company, in Debrecen
 22nd Radar Company, in Békéscsaba
 Gap Filling Radar Company, in Medina
 59th Air Base "Dezső Szentgyörgyi", at Kecskemét Air Base
 Base Operations Centre
 Tactical Fighter Squadron "Puma", with 14x JAS-39C/D Gripen
 Airlift Squadron "Teve", with 1x An-26, 2x Airbus A319 (HuAF604, HuAF605), 1x Dassault Falcon 7X (HuAF606)
 Operations Support Battalion
 Maintenance Battalion
 Logistic Battalion
 64th Logistic Regiment "József Szabó", in Kaposvár
 Command Company
 National Support Battalion
 Transport Battalion
 Movement Control Company
 National Support Centre, in Budapest
 86th Helicopter Base "Szolnok", at Szolnok Air Base
 Base Operations Centre
 Transport Helicopter Squadron "Ernő Rubik", with 3x Mi-8, 5x Mi-17
 Mixed Training Squadron, with 2x AS350, 2x Z-242, 2x Z-143
 Operations Support Battalion
 Maintenance Battalion
 Logistic Battalion
 Pápa Air Base
 Base Operations Centre
 Heavy Airlift Wing (NATO Strategic Airlift Capability), with 3x C-17 Globemaster III
 Operations Support Battalion
 Logistic Battalion
 Information Protection Group
 Air Operations Centre, in Veszprém
 Air Operations Centre
 Air Traffic Control Centre
 Reserve and Training Air Traffic Control Centre, at Kecskemét Air Base
 Military Air Traffic Management Centre
 Meteorological Centre
 Simulation and Exercise Centre
Civilian–Military Cooperation and Psychological Operations Centre, in Szentendre
 CIMIC Operational Planning, and PSYOPS Operational Planning Group
 CIMIC Evaluation and Liaison Group
 1st CIMIC Group
 2nd CIMIC Group
 Target Evaluation and Analysis Group
 Media Evaluation and Analysis Group
 Product Development and Production Group
 1st PSYOPS Support Group
 2nd PSYOPS Support Group
 Support Group
 NBC-defense Information Centre "Artúr Görgei", in Budapest
 93rd CBRN defense Battalion "Sándor Petőfi", in Székesfehérvár
 Command Company
 CBRN-decontaminating Company
 CBRN-reconnaissance Company
 CBRN-support Company
 Support Company

Hungarian Defense Forces Formation, Preparation and Training Command 
 Hungarian Defense Forces Formation, Preparation and Training Command, in Budapest
 Hungarian Defense Forces Academy, in Szentendre
 Military Administration and Central Registry, in Budapest
 Peace Support Training Centre, in Szolnok
 Bakony Combat Training Centre, in Várpalota
 Simulation and Training Centre
 Training Base Bakonykúti
 Training Base Hajmáskér
 Training Base Táborfalva
 Training Base Újdörögd
 Examination Company
 Logistic Company
 Training Battalion "Ludovika", in Budapest

Hungarian Defense Forces Logistic Centre 
 Hungarian Defense Forces Logistic Centre, in Budapest
 Materiel Supply Warehouse, in Budapest
 Military Transport Centre, in Budapest
 Aircraft Repair Facility, at Kecskemét Air Base

Directly reporting units 
 Units reporting directly to Hungarian Defense Forces General Staff, in Budapest
 Budapest Garrison Brigade "Vitéz Sándor Szurmay", in Budapest
 32nd National Honor Guard Battalion
 HDF National Band
 Defense Ministry Signal and C4I Centre
 Support Battalion
 Transport Battalion
 Maintenance Company
 Military Law Enforcement Centre, in Budapest
 Military Police Group Debrecen
 Military Police Group Szolnok
 Military Police Group Hódmezővásárhely
 Military Police Group Kaposvár
 Military Police Group Székesfehérvár
 Military Police Group Győr
 Medical Centre, in Budapest
 Geoinformation Service, in Budapest
 Recreation, Training and Conference Centre, in Balatonakarattya
 Units reporting directly to Minister of Defense, in Budapest
 Military National Security Service (KNBSZ), in Budapest
 Signal, C4I and Information Security Group, in Budapest

Armed Forces structure graphic

Geographic distribution of operational units

Specific unit details

34th Bercsényi László Special Forces Battalion 
The 34th Bercsényi László Special Forces Battalion serves as the HDF's special operations forces, specializing in unconventional warfare, internal defense, and counter-terrorism since 1959. It was originally designed to be a parachute unit in World War Two but was reorganized in the 50s to be enlarged in personnel and duties. Since its move to Szolnok in 2001, it has been trained by the Mobile Training Team of the United States Army and has been deployed to Afghanistan to assist other special forces units there.

93rd Petőfi Sándor CBRN defense Battalion 
The battalion is a unit that participates in the prevention of CBRN accidents on Hungarian territory. Its assigned personnel and technical equipment are part of the Defense Disaster Management System. It was raised between 15 October and 1 November 1950 as the 9th Independent Chemical Warfare Regiment in Budafok. After several reorganisations, the regiment became a battalion, then in 1990 the unit was given the honorific "Sándor Petőfi". In 2000, the battalion became a regiment once again and was moved to Székesfehérvár. The move to Székesfehérvár was followed by several organizational changes and has undergone major transformations and modernizations.

32nd National Honor Guard Regiment 

The 32nd National Home Defense Ceremonial Regiment (32. Nemzeti Honvéd Díszegység) has been the official Guard of honour unit of the HDF, from 1 January 2011. It took over the protocol duties from the former Ceremonial Battalion (Honvéd Díszzászlóalj) which was founded in 2007 and that was in turn preceded by the 32nd Budapest Guard and Ceremonial Regiment (MH 32. Budapest Őr- és Díszezred), which traced back until 1991.

This ceremonial unit takes part in the welcoming of foreign dignitaries to Budapest. Furthermore, it mounts the Sándor Palace Guard, the Hungarian Parliament Guard and the Holy Crown Guard. The battalion has also a mounted detachment, clad in historical green-red hussars uniforms.

The official ceremonial honour guard of the Hungarian People's Republic was the 7015th Ceremonial Regiment of the Hungarian People's Army.

HDF Central Band 

The Hungarian Defense Forces Central Military Band (Magyar Honvédség Központi Zenekar) is the representative musical ensemble of the HDF.  Although it was officially founded in 1962, its history goes back to 1896, when the first Hungarian military band of music was established in Budapest. Today, the Central Band maintains a fanfare unit as well as a drum corps. The primary task of the Central Band is to take part in national, military, and protocol events.  Other activities include cultivation of Hungarian soldiers and wind-music traditions, the promotion and amateur brass bands.  The Central Band is a regular participant in international and domestic festivals, and nearly a dozen CDs of performances by the Central Band have been published.

References

Hungarian Defence Forces